is a Japanese former competitive figure skater. He is the 1999 Triglav Trophy champion and competed at the 2000 World Junior Championships, where he placed 24th. He competed in three seasons of the ISU Junior Grand Prix, winning the silver medal at the 1998 event in Mexico. His highest placement at the senior Japanese Championships was 6th. Iwamoto retired from competitive skating following his graduation from university. He now works as a coach and choreographer.

Competitive highlights
JGP: Junior Series/Junior Grand Prix

References 

JGP results

Japanese male single skaters
1980 births
Living people
Sportspeople from Tottori Prefecture
Competitors at the 2001 Winter Universiade
Competitors at the 2003 Winter Universiade
Figure skating choreographers